Laryea is a Ghanaian surname of the Ga language Notable people with the surname include:

Anyetei Laryea (born 1978), Ghanaian boxer
Emmanuel Nii Okai Laryea (born 1983), Ghanaian politician
Frederick Daniel Laryea, Ghanaian diplomat 
Gabriel Laryea (1924–2009), Ghanaian sprinter 
Israel Laryea, Ghanaian journalist
Joseph Laryea (born 1965), Ghanaian boxer
Richie Laryea (born 1995), Canadian soccer player
Wayne Laryea (born 1952), British musician and television actor

See also
Laryea (given name)